= Léon Schmit =

Luxembourgish footballer

Personal information
- Date of birth: 29 March 1947 (age 79)
- Position: Defender

Senior career*
Years	Team	Apps	(Gls)
1969–1971	National Schifflange		
1971–1976	Jeunesse Esch		

International career
1971–1975	Luxembourg	3	(0)
- * Club domestic league appearances and goals

Léon Schmit (born 29 March 1947) is a retired Luxembourgish football defender.
